The A36 is a road in Northern Ireland. It travels through County Antrim, connecting the large towns of Ballymena and Larne.

The road is a single-carriageway primary route.

Route
The A36 commences at the Junction 10 roundabout of the M2 Ballymena by-pass.  The road passes through the village of Moorfields, the hamlets of Glenwherry and Kilwaughter, and meets the B59 route coming south from Doagh and the B94 route from Ballyclare to Broughshane.  The A36 terminates at a junction with the A8 dual carriageway on the outskirts of Larne.

The A36's highest point is the  summit of Shane's Hill.

Roads in Northern Ireland
Roads in County Antrim